Edgar Lanier Jenkins (January 4, 1933 – January 1, 2012) was an American politician who served eight terms as the U.S. representative for Georgia's 9th congressional district from 1977 to 1993. He was a member of the Democratic Party.

Biography 
Jenkins, who was born in Young Harris, Georgia, served in the Coast Guard from 1952 to 1955, and as administrative assistant to congressman Phillip M. Landrum from 1959 to 1962.

Congress 
He was elected to Congress in 1976. He supported protection for the textile industry and capital gains tax cuts. In 1989, he challenged Richard Gephardt for Majority Leader but lost by a margin of 76 to 181 votes.

Death 
He left Congress in 1993. Jenkins died, just three days before his 79th birthday, in Atlanta.

References

External links

 

1933 births
2012 deaths
United States Coast Guard officers
University of Georgia alumni
Georgia (U.S. state) lawyers
Democratic Party members of the United States House of Representatives from Georgia (U.S. state)
People from Towns County, Georgia
20th-century American politicians
20th-century American lawyers

Members of Congress who became lobbyists